Gaston Zananiri (1904 – 1996) was an eminent scholar, historian, and poet of Alexandria, Egypt.

Life 

Gaston Zananiri was born in 1904 in the city of Alexandria in Egypt. His father Georges Zananiri Pasha (1863–1956) was Secretary General of the Sanitary Maritime and Quarantine Board of Egypt. He belonged to a Syrian Melkite family which had migrated to Egypt from Syria centuries earlier. Gaston's mother was Marie Ines Bauer, of Hungarian Jewish extraction on her father's side and Italian on her mother's side. She converted to Christianity and moved in Zionist circles in Egypt and Palestine in the early 20th century, Gaston would also follow in his mothers footsteps and associate himself with Zionist movements in Palestine. In his youth Gaston attended Victoria College, Alexandria, where he received his education. Gaston worked for the Egyptian Foreign Office from 1940 to 1950. In 1948 Gaston founded the Alexandrian center of studies'' and in 1951 he moved to Paris in France and became a Dominican priest.

 Works 
In 1939 Gaston published L'Esprit Méditerranéen dans le Proche Orient. Gaston's life work was entitled Dictionnaire général de la francophonie'''. He completed his memoirs in 1982.

References 

1904 births
1996 deaths
Writers from Alexandria
20th-century Egyptian poets
Egyptian journalists
Egyptian male poets
Egyptian Melkite Greek Catholics
Levantine-Egyptians
20th-century male writers
20th-century journalists